Country is an RIAA Gold-certified compilation album by Canadian Country artist Anne Murray, issued in 1974 on Capitol Records.

The album reached #6 on the Billboard Country albums chart and #32 on the Billboard Pop albums chart. The album included material from Murray's previous albums This Way Is My Way, Snowbird, Honey, Wheat and Laughter, Talk It Over in the Morning, Straight, Clean and Simple and Danny's Song,

Track listing
"He Thinks I Still Care" (Dickey Lee, Steve Duffy)
"Cotton Jenny" (Gordon Lightfoot)
"Break My Mind" (John D. Loudermilk)
"A Stranger in My Place" (Kenny Rogers, Kin Vassy)
"Snowbird" (Gene MacLellan)
"Son of a Rotten Gambler" (Chip Taylor)
"Danny's Song" (Kenny Loggins)
"What About Me" (Scott McKenzie)
"Bidin' My Time" (MacLellan)
"Put Your Hand in the Hand" (MacLellan)

References

1974 greatest hits albums
Anne Murray compilation albums
Albums produced by Brian Ahern (producer)
Capitol Records compilation albums